Jean-Baptiste Belley (c. July 1746 – 6 August 1805) was a Saint Dominican and French politician. A native of Senegal and formerly enslaved in the colony of Saint-Domingue, in the French West Indies, he was an elected member of the Estates General, the National Convention, and the Council of Five Hundred during the French First Republic. He was also known as Mars.

Life
Belley was said to have been born on 1 July 1746 or 1747 on the island of Gorée, Senegal, but the precise dates of his birth and death are uncertain. At the age of two, he was sold to slavers sailing for the French colony of Saint-Domingue. With his savings, he later bought his freedom.

In 1791, Saint Dominican Creoles began the French Revolution in Saint-Domingue; they incited a slave rebellion, aimed at the overthrow of the Bourbon Regime. As their fellow revolutionaries in France thought the Declaration of the Rights of Man of 1789, they began to see that slavery would need to be abolished.

In 1793, Belley was a captain of infantry, fought against the Bourbon forces of Saint-Domingue and was six times wounded. On 24 September 1793, he was one of three members (deputés) elected to the French National Convention by the northern region of Saint-Domingue, together with Jean-Baptiste Mills, of mixed race, and Louis-Pierre Dufaÿ, a European, thus becoming the first black deputy to take a seat in the convention. On 3 February 1794, he spoke in a debate in the Convention when it decided unanimously to abolish slavery.

However, the formal abolition of slavery did not disarm the Bourbon Government supporters, and the war continued. Although he was recognized as a full citizen of the Republic, Belley was an active spokesman for black people. When Benoît Gouly, a pro-slavery deputy from Mauritius in the Indian Ocean, called for special laws for the French colonies, Belley denounced a pressure group of colonists meeting at the Hôtel Massiac called Club de l'hôtel de Massiac in a speech published under the title Le Bout d'oreille des colons, ou le système de l’Hôtel Massiac mis à jour par Gouly. He succeeded for a time in maintaining the Republican principle of equality between people in France and in its colonies, whatever their colour.

In a declaration of age and marital status for the representatives of Saint-Domingue in the convention, Belley says that he was born at Gorée, is forty-eight years old, has never left the territory of the republic, and has lived forty six years at Cap-Français. In a 'declaration of fortune' dated at Paris on 10 Vendémiaire, Year 4 of the Republic (viz., 1 October 1795), Belley declares that from the Republic he has only his 'emoluments', that he has bought no property, and that he owns only the contents of his room.

Belley remained as a Convention member until 1797, when he lost his seat. He returned to Saint-Domingue with Charles Leclerc's expedition of 1802 as an officer of gendarmes, but he was arrested, sent back to France and imprisoned in the fortress of Belle Île. He was still being held prisoner there in 1805 when he wrote to Isaac Louverture, the son of Toussaint Louverture. He died later the same year.

Portrait
In about 1797, Belley's portrait was painted by Anne-Louis Girodet de Roussy-Trioson, a former pupil of Jacques-Louis David, and was exhibited in Paris in 1798. In this painting, Girodet evokes the tensions of the period. Belley, standing, wears the uniform of a Convention member, with a tropical landscape behind him, and has a stylish relaxed pose, as favoured in many French political portraits of Revolutionary politicians. His elbow rests on a bust of the philosopher Guillaume-Thomas Raynal (1713–1796), author of A Philosophical and Political History of the Settlements and Trade of the Europeans in the East and West Indies (1770). Raynal, who had just died, had been a supporter of the abolition of slavery.

A drawing by Girodet for the portrait in ink and black chalk is in the Art Institute of Chicago, purchased with funds from the Joseph and Helen Regenstein Foundation in 1973. The portrait was used for the dust cover of Christopher Bayly's book The Birth of the Modern World 1780–1914: Global Connections and Comparisons (Oxford: Blackwell, 2004).

References
page on the French National Assembly website

External links
 Portrait of Belley at abcgallery.com

1740s births
1805 deaths
People from Dakar
French people of Senegalese descent
People of Saint-Domingue
Deputies to the French National Convention
Members of the Council of Five Hundred
Haitian slaves
People of the Haitian Revolution
French people who died in prison custody
Prisoners who died in French detention
Black French politicians